Iveta Tonoyan  (born 22 November 1981), is an Armenian politician and journalist, member of the National Assembly since was elected in 2017 parliamentary election for Prosperous Armenia, an re-elected in 2018 election.

Born in  Yerevan, in Soviet Armenia, she graduated in Journalism for Yerevan State University on 2002 and between 2002 and 2010 worked in Kentron TV, and between 2010 and 2012 Head of the Public Relations Departmanet of the Minister of Sports and Youth. She is also the spokeswoman of athlete, businessman and leader of Prosperous Armenia party Gagik Tsarukyan and was president of Tsarukyan's foundation.

References

1981 births
Living people
Prosperous Armenia politicians
Politicians from Yerevan
Yerevan State University alumni
Members of the National Assembly (Armenia)
Armenian journalists
Armenian women journalists
21st-century Armenian women politicians
21st-century Armenian politicians